Vladimir Georgievich Dekanozov (born Ivan Vasilyevich Protopopov; June 1898 – 23 December 1953) was a Soviet senior state security operative and diplomat.

According to the sentenced issued by Military Collegium of the Supreme Court of the Soviet Union  he was an associate of "Lavrentiy Beria gang" and was sentenced to death in 1953. The sentence was carried out shortly after.

Biography

Early life
According to the official biography, Vladimir Dekanozov was born in Baku, Azerbaijan, to the family of Giorgi Dekanozishvili, founder of the Party of Georgian Social-Federalists. Dekanozishvili, in Georgian meaning Son of a Deacon, was said to have been a noble Georgian family belonging to the Georgian Orthodox Church.  Although he self-identified as a Georgian, some rumors falsely suggested that he might have Armenian heritage due to his russified name. These rumours are known to have originated as a joke from Joseph Stalin who frequently teased and mocked Dekanozov.  

Some historians have concluded that he assumed the name Dekanozov and a Georgian ethnic identity in order to hide his true origin, something that was quite common among the Bolsheviks.  According  to the  Lithuanian  writer Liudas  Dovydenas, who knew him,  the blonde and blue-eyed Dekanozov was not Georgian, but rather a person from Estonia. Dovydenas asserted that Dekanozov's father was an ethnic Russian and  that his mother was from a Jewish family assimilated to Baltic German culture. This is also supported by a statement by J. Edgar Hoover, presumably based on British intelligence, that Dekanozov was  born  in  Estonia  and  that  his  real  name  was  Ivan  Vasilyevich  Protopopov.

Dekanozov's official biography states that he studied in the medical schools of Saratov University and Baku University. In 1918 he entered the Red Army, and in 1920 he joined the Bolshevik Party. From 1918 he allegedly worked as a secret agent in Transcaucasia, first in the People's Commissariat for Health of the short-lived Azerbaijan Democratic Republic, then in private oil companies. After the invasion of Azerbaijan by the Red Army, Dekanozov worked for the Cheka of Azerbaijan SSR, where he befriended Lavrenty Beria, who subsequently supported Dekanozov.  In 1921–27 Dekanozov worked  for the Cheka in Azerbaijan, Georgia, and Transcaucasia. In 1927 he became an instructor of the Central Committee of the Communist Party of Georgia. In 1928–1931 he worked as one of the leaders of the Georgian and Transcaucasian OGPU. In 1931 he became a secretary of the Central Committee of the Communist Party of Georgia. From 1936 he was the Narkom of the food industry of Georgia, and from 1937 he simultaneously worked as the Chairman of Gosplan of Georgia and a deputy Chairman of Georgian Sovnarkom. He was a deputy of the Supreme Soviet of the USSR in 1937–50.

He was transferred to the NKVD in November 1938, when Lavrentii Beria was appointed its head. Dekanozov was the deputy chief of GUGB and at the same time headed both its foreign intelligence and counterintelligence departments from 1938 to 1939. Dekanozov was responsible for purges of the Red Army as well as for purging Nikolai Yezhov's supporters from the NKVD.

In May 1939 he was appointed deputy chief of the People's Commissariat for Foreign Affairs (NKID). His sphere of responsibility before 1941 included Iran, Turkey, Afghanistan, Mongolia, and Xinjiang, as well as the consulates, cadres, and finances of NKID.

Second World War

Incorporation of Lithuania into the USSR

Soviet military forces crossed the Lithuanian border on 15 June 1940, with the military of Lithuania being ordered not to resist. Dekanozov arrived on the same day to organise the incorporation of Lithuania into the Soviet Union. The Communist Party of Lithuania, headed by Antanas Sniečkus, was at his disposal. The Soviet military established a controlling presence that allowed Dekanozov to fulfill his function as representative of the Communist Party. The process creating the Lithuanian Soviet Socialist Republic was Dekanozov's work. He installed himself in the Soviet embassy and imposed on Lithuania the Soviet party-state structure in which the traditional governmental forms were of only secondary importance. Dekanozov restructured the Lithuanian government, naming Justas Paleckis, a Lithuanian leftist who was not yet a member of the Communist Party, as Prime Minister. 

Aided by specialists for Soviet administration and Soviet security organs sent in from Moscow, Dekanozov worked through the Lithuanian Communist Party, while the cabinet of ministers, headed by Paleckis, served an administrative function. Dekanozov and Paleckis brought a number of non-members of the Communist Party (but still pro-communists) into the first "people’s government", but in retrospect it is clear that they constituted window dressing for the Soviet takeover. For his part, Dekanozov pushed his program carefully, concentrating first of all on denouncing the Smetona regime in Lithuania, then promising to respect private property, assuring Lithuanians that agriculture would not be collectivized, and restraining any discussion of the possibility of joining the Soviet Union until mid-July.

On 6 July Dekanozov’s government announced that on 14 July there would be elections for a new parliament, a so-called People's Seimas.  The Lithuanian Communist Party announced the formation of the Union of the Toiling People of Lithuania, which offered a slate of candidates, including some ten non-members of the Communist Party, with as many people as there were seats in the new parliament up for election. On 11 and 12 July, the Soviet authorities reduced the possible points of opposition by arresting leading figures of the old regime and deporting some of them to the interior of the Soviet Union, although Lithuania was still formally an independent state. 

Dekanozov used the Lithuanian government, and the Communist Party of Lithuania, as his instruments to carry out the will of the Soviet party leadership.  Throughout the process, Soviet propagandists insisted there was only one acceptable path for the country, and all were obliged to follow it. They concentrated on creating an image of mass support, and they called for determined measures against those who somehow opposed the new order and wanted to sabotage the elections of 14 July.

Lithuania became a part of the Stalinist Soviet party-state, administered within the All-Union Communist Party (Bolsheviks) structure, long before it was formally incorporated into the governmental structure of the Soviet Union. By the time the new Soviet state structure in Lithuania had been formalized, Dekanozov had long since left Lithuania. In July 1940 he had returned to Moscow, his job completed, when the People's Seimas voted to ask for membership in the USSR. In barely more than a month, he had reorganized the Lithuanian state, set the social and economic development on Lithuania onto a new course, and contributed to the enlargement of the Soviet state. The Sovietisation of Lithuania started by Dekanozov was carried on by Nikolai Pozdniakov.

Work in Berlin

From November 1940 Dekanozov, remaining the deputy chief of NKID, was also the Soviet ambassador to Berlin. In September 1943, he made a mysterious visit to Stockholm that was interpreted by German Foreign Minister Joachim von Ribbentrop as a sign of Soviet interest in making a separate peace with Germany. Adolf Hitler, however, refused von Ribbentrop's plea that he be allowed to dispatch an envoy to Sweden.

After the Second World War

Dekanozov continued to be the deputy chief of NKID and then of the Foreign Affairs Ministry until 1947. He held other senior positions before being appointed the Interior Minister of Georgian SSR (after Beria became the Interior Minister of the USSR) in April 1953. A close associate of Beria, he was removed from state positions almost immediately after Beria's removal. 

Dekanozov was considered to be a member of the so-called "Beria gang". He was arrested in June 1953 and was sentenced to death on 23 December 1953. The sentence was carried out the same day.

His case was reviewed both by the Soviet Union during the glasnost era and by the Russian Federation after the collapse of the USSR. In both cases he was ruled ineligible for rehabilitation.

See also
Soviet–German relations before 1941

References

Nijolė Maslauskienė. The Purge of Civil Servants in Soviet Occupied Lithuania between June–December 1940

1898 births
1953 deaths
Bolsheviks
Commissars 3rd Class of State Security
Communist Party of the Soviet Union members
Ambassadors of the Soviet Union to Germany
Ambassador Extraordinary and Plenipotentiary (Soviet Union)
Communist Party of Georgia (Soviet Union) politicians
Georgian Soviet Socialist Republic
Soviet Georgian generals
Soviet colonel generals
Soviet diplomats
Soviet Georgian NKVD officials
Soviet Jews
Jews executed by the Soviet Union
Estonian Jews
Estonian people of Russian descent